1980 JSL Cup Final was the fifth final of the JSL Cup competition. The final was played at Osaka Nagai Stadium in Osaka on August 24, 1980. Nippon Kokan won the championship.

Overview
Nippon Kokan won their 1st title, by defeating Hitachi 3–1.

Match details

See also
1980 JSL Cup

References

JSL Cup
1980 in Japanese football
Kashiwa Reysol matches